The 1946-47 French Rugby Union Championship of first division was contested by 64 clubs divided in 16 pools. The eight first pools qualified 24 clubs for next phase . Eight other club were qualified from other eight pools.

The thirty-two teams qualified play the second round with eight pools of four.
The two better were qualified to play the "Last 16" phase.

The Championship was won by Toulouse that beat Agen in the final, played on the ground of Stade Toulousain.

Context 

The 1947 Five Nations Championship was won by Wales and by Ireland.

The "Coupe de France" was won by Toulouse that beat the Montferrand in the final.

Phase de qualification 

In bold the qualified for "last 16" phase.

Last 16 

In bold the clubs qualified for the quarter of finals.

Quarter of finals 

In bold the clubs qualified for the semifinals.

Semifinals

Semifinals

Final 

Note the presence of Albert Ferrasse and Guy Basquet: both will be future president and vice-president of French Rugby Federation.

Guy Basquet, ended the match after a compromise. He was sent off by referee after a very bad fault, but after the protests of Agen player and managers, a federal manager, propose a temporary suspension.

Temporary suspension that was officially introduced only six decades after.

External links
 Compte rendu de la finale de 1947, sur lnr.fr

1947
France 1947
Championship